is a baseball stadium in the city of Kariya, Aichi Prefecture, Japan. It was also used as an Association football stadium until 1994.

It hosted the 1950 Emperor's Cup final game between All Kwangaku and Keio University, which was played there on June 4, 1950.

External links
Official site

Sports venues in Aichi Prefecture
Football venues in Japan
Kariya, Aichi
Sports venues completed in 1950
1950 establishments in Japan